Norman Sussman (May 26, 1905April 20, 1969) was an American grocer and Democratic politician.  He was a member of the Wisconsin State Senate from 1961 until his death in 1969.  He previously served two terms in the State Assembly.

Biography
Sussman was born on May 26, 1905, in Philadelphia, Pennsylvania. He graduated from Milwaukee Public Schools, and attended the Milwaukee School of Engineering for one year.

Sussman worked as a grocer, and as a business representative for the American Federation of State, County and Municipal Employees Local 2, before going to work at the Milwaukee Natatorium, of which he was assistant director when first elected to the Assembly.
 
Sussman died on April 20, 1969.

Political career
Sussman was a member of the Assembly from 1957 to 1960 and of the Senate from 1961 to 1969. He was a Democrat.

References

Politicians from Philadelphia
Democratic Party Wisconsin state senators
Democratic Party members of the Wisconsin State Assembly
1905 births
1969 deaths
Milwaukee School of Engineering alumni
20th-century American politicians
American Federation of State, County and Municipal Employees people